This is a list of gliders/sailplanes of the world, (this reference lists all gliders with references, where available) 
Note: Any aircraft can glide for a short time, but gliders are designed to glide for longer.

Latvian miscellaneous constructors 
data from:- 
 Acs (glider)
 Aizsardze
 Alise (glider)
 Apogs
 Auseklis (glider)
 Burbulmate
 Cirulitis
 Cukurs C-4 – Herberts Cukurs
 Daugaviete
 Vainode Duja – A Hutter-17 type, based in Vainode. Built by the 17th Glider Aviator Group.
 2nd Aviation Scouts Duja – A primary type constructed by the 2nd Aviation Scouts.
 Dzelzcelnieks
 Dzelzcelnieks II
 Dzelzcelnieks III
 Dzerve
 Edgars laksevics
 Erglis
 Gaigalina
 Gintaras (glider)
 Gulbene II
 Gulbis (glider)
 Jelgava-Hütter 17
 Vilnis-Hütter 17 – Edvins Vilnis
 Stekelis-Hütter 17 – Huberts Stekelis
 Jelgava I
 Kaija (glider)
 Krustpilnieks
 Lāčplēsis (glider)
 Latvija (glider)
 Lenta (glider)
 Maikapars
 Mara (glider)
 Mintava
 Nameisis
 Parsla
 Salka (glider)
 Selija (glider)
 Skaubitis
 Skauts
 Skrunda I
 Sloka (glider)
 Spriditis (glider)
 Staburags (glider)
 Tērvete (glider)
 Valmierietis
 Vanadzins
 Vanags (glider)
 Vef-1
 Viesturs (glider)
 YL-12
 YL-13
 YL-14 "fricis tramdachs"
 Zemgale (glider)
 Ziemelnieks

Notes

Further reading

External links

Lists of glider aircraft